"Sexy (Is the Word)" is a song by Australian singer Melissa (Tkautz). It was released as her second single, following "Read My Lips".  Like "Read My Lips", "Sexy (Is the Word)" was launched via the television series that Tkautz was starring in at the time, E Street. The song appears on her debut album, Fresh (1992).

Music video
The music video for his single features Melissa in a number of guises. She is seen in hot pink lingerie and in a leather Jacket, cavorting with a large block of ice.

2005 re-recording
In 2005, Tkautz relaunched her music career with the album Lost and Found, which included two new versions of "Sexy (Is The Word)". These were contemporary remixes where new vocals were recorded, and whilst not released as a single, the song received much attention in nightclubs around Australia. There was a film clip released with this track to clubs which was a re-edited version of the original music video.

Track listings
7-inch, CD, and cassette single
 "Sexy (Is the Word)"
 "My Favourite Room"

12-inch single
A1. "Sexy (Is the Word)" (12-inch Electric Laser remix)
B1. "My Favourite Room"
B2. "Sexy (Is the Word)"

Charts

Weekly charts

Year-end charts

Sales and certifications

References

1991 singles
1991 songs
Melissa Tkautz songs
Mercury Records singles
Phonogram Records singles
Songs written by Leon Berger